Jamal Yaqoub Al-Qabendi (7 April 1959 in Kazmi – 13 April 2021) was a Kuwaiti footballer who played as a defender for Kuwait in the 1982 FIFA World Cup. He also played for Kazma Sporting Club.

He died on 13 April 2021 from complications of a diabetes.

References

External links
FIFA profile

1959 births
2021 deaths
Kuwaiti footballers
Kuwait international footballers
Association football defenders
Olympic footballers of Kuwait
Footballers at the 1980 Summer Olympics
1982 FIFA World Cup players
Deaths from diabetes
Asian Games medalists in football
Footballers at the 1982 Asian Games
Footballers at the 1986 Asian Games
1980 AFC Asian Cup players
1984 AFC Asian Cup players
1988 AFC Asian Cup players
AFC Asian Cup-winning players
Asian Games silver medalists for Kuwait
Asian Games bronze medalists for Kuwait
Medalists at the 1982 Asian Games
Medalists at the 1986 Asian Games
Kazma SC players
Kazma SC managers
Kuwait Premier League managers
Kuwait Premier League players
Kuwaiti football managers